SAV Vacallo Basket is a professional basketball club based in Vacallo, Switzerland. The club has previously played in both the Swiss LNA and LNB divisions.

Honours
Swiss Basketball League: (1)
 2009

Swiss Basketball Cup: (4)
 1999, 2000, 2008, 2009

LNB Championship: (1)
2005

Notable players
 Georgios Diamantopoulos
 Michalis Kakiouzis
 Larry O'Bannon
 Jermaine Turner

External links
Official website 
SAV Vacallo Basket at eurobasket.com

Basketball teams in Switzerland